Marcel Hossa (born 12 October 1981) is a Slovak former professional ice hockey left winger. Hossa previously played in the National Hockey League (NHL) with the Montreal Canadiens, New York Rangers and Phoenix Coyotes, having been drafted by the Canadiens in the first round, 16th overall, in the 2000 NHL Entry Draft.

Hossa has also played in the Kontinental Hockey League (KHL) for Dinamo Riga, Ak Bars Kazan and Spartak Moscow. Internationally, Hossa has represented Slovakia on several occasions, including at the 2006, 2010 and 2014 Winter Olympics.

Hossa's older brother is Marián Hossa, also a professional ice hockey player, who is a three-time Stanley Cup champion and a member of Hockey Hall of Fame.

Playing career
Hossa was selected in the first round of the 2000 NHL Entry Draft, 16th overall, by the Montreal Canadiens. Prior to relocating to North America, he first played junior hockey in his native Slovakia with Dukla Trenčín before joining the Portland Winter Hawks of the Western Hockey League (WHL) ahead of the 1998–99 season.

Several seasons later, Hossa led the Winterhawks in scoring and to the WHL finals in 2000–01, his third year in the WHL, before turning professional the following season with the Canadiens' then-American Hockey League (AHL) affiliate, the Quebec Citadelles. He played the majority of the 2001–02 season with the Citadelles, finishing fifth on the team in points with 32. He was recalled by the Canadiens midway through the season and made his NHL debut, ultimately appearing in ten games.

Over the next two seasons, Hossa split time between the Canadiens and the team's new AHL affiliate, the Hamilton Bulldogs, being named in the 2003 NHL YoungStars Game. Despite showing promise, however, Hossa was unable to establish a full-time role with Montreal at the NHL level. During the 2004 2004–05 NHL lockout, he signed a one-year contract with Swedish team Mora IK of the Elitserien on September 25, 2004, reuniting him with older brother, Marián Hossa; Marcel Hossa finished the year fifth in team scoring with 24 points.

Prior to the 2005–06 season, on September 30, 2005, Hossa was traded to the New York Rangers in exchange for Garth Murray. In his first season with the Rangers, Hossa appeared in a career-high 64 games and scored ten goals. In 2006–07, after a slow start to the year, he was later shifted to the team's top line in February, responding with eight goals in 11 games, finishing the season with an NHL career-high 18 points. His season was then halted, however, after injuring his right knee in a 2–1 victory over the New York Islanders on March 5, 2007.

In the 2007–08 season, Hossa struggled to regain his offensive form and played in 36 games with the Rangers before he was assigned to the team's AHL affiliate, the Hartford Wolf Pack, on a conditioning stint on February 16, 2008. On February 26, he was then traded to the Phoenix Coyotes, along with goaltender Al Montoya, in exchange for Fredrik Sjöström, David LeNeveu and Josh Gratton. Hossa played out the season with the Coyotes, going scoreless in 14 games.

On July 3, 2008, as an unrestricted free agent, Hossa signed with Dinamo Riga of the newly-formed Kontinental Hockey League (KHL). After leading Riga with 22 goals in the 2008–09 season, Hossa went a step further in 2009–10, leading the KHL in goals with 35. Following his impressive offensive output, he was selected to play internationally for Slovakia—alongside brother Marián—in the 2010 Winter Olympics in Vancouver.

On May 7, 2010, Hossa left Riga and after signing a two-year contract with reigning KHL champions Ak Bars Kazan.

On July 26, 2011, Hossa signed a one-year contract with Spartak Moscow.

On May 16, 2013, announced that Hossa is returning to Dinamo Riga after signing a one-year contract, later being released from the team on December 20, 2014. On January 30, 2015, however, he signed a contract with Modo Hockey in Sweden to play out the remainder of the 2014–15 season.

Career statistics

Regular season and playoffs

International

Awards and honors

See also
Notable families in the NHL

References

External links
 
 
 
 

1981 births
Living people
Ak Bars Kazan players
Dinamo Riga players
Hamilton Bulldogs (AHL) players
Hartford Wolf Pack players
HC Oceláři Třinec players
HK Dukla Trenčín players
HC Lev Praha players
HC Plzeň players
HC Spartak Moscow players
Ice hockey players at the 2006 Winter Olympics
Ice hockey players at the 2010 Winter Olympics
Ice hockey players at the 2014 Winter Olympics
Modo Hockey players
Montreal Canadiens draft picks
Montreal Canadiens players
Mora IK players
National Hockey League first-round draft picks
New York Rangers players
Olympic ice hockey players of Slovakia
People from Ilava
Sportspeople from the Trenčín Region
Phoenix Coyotes players
Portland Winterhawks players
Quebec Citadelles players
Slovak expatriate ice hockey players in Russia
Slovak ice hockey left wingers
Slovak expatriate ice hockey players in the United States
Slovak expatriate ice hockey players in Canada
Slovak expatriate ice hockey players in Sweden
Slovak expatriate sportspeople in Latvia
Slovak expatriate ice hockey players in the Czech Republic
Expatriate ice hockey players in Latvia